Hanson Academy (formerly Hanson Grammar School and then Hanson School) is a coeducational secondary school and sixth form located in Bradford, West Yorkshire, England.

Admissions
Hanson Academy is situated between Bolton and Five Lane Ends.

History

Grammar school
The Hanson Grammar School was designed by Charles Henry Hargreaves and opened on Byron Street near Barkerend Road in 1897. Boys' and girls' schools were next door to each other.

In 1967 the girls' school had moved to a new building on Sutton Avenue. In the early 1970s, although retaining the name of a grammar school, the intake was comprehensive. The girls' school had around 500 girls, with 80 in the sixth form. The boys' school had around 550 boys with 120 in the sixth form.

Comprehensive
It became the co-educational Hanson School in 1972, situated at the Sutton Avenue site. In the 1980s, the Sutton Avenue site was known as Hanson Upper School. In July 2011 the school moved to a different building but within the same Sutton Avenue grounds.

In 2010, the secondary school was placed in special measures following an Ofsted inspection. Derek Needham, who was acting head teacher, following Tim Brookes' resignation following the inspection, commented on the school being put into special measures saying:
"I do not believe Hanson School is a bad school, the Ofsted inspectors didn't look at all aspects of the school, they just focused on the school's many problems rather than its little achievements".

In 2014 Hanson School was in the media because of the high number of students, more than 200, sent home for not adhering to the uniform policy.

In January 2018 the school came out of special measures, and is currently graded by Ofsted as "Requires Improvement".

Academy
Previously a foundation school administered by Bradford City Council, in July 2022 Hanson School converted to academy status and was renamed Hanson Academy. The school is now sponsored by the Delta Academies Trust.

Head teachers
David Hewitt (2022–present)
Richard Woods (2016–2022)
Elizabeth Churton (2012–2015)
Tim Brookes (2008–2010)
Susan Horsley (2003-2008)
Maureen Jones
Lily Peters

Campus
Hanson has four floors. There is a sixth-form centre. There is a footballing centre, home to "Goals", which has 15+ five aside pitches and 1 full-size football pitch.

A new school building was completed in 2011. The building of Pulse Gym was also completed in 2010; it has a 65-station gym, interactive centre, sports hall and two dance studios. The gym is for pupil use as well as for members of the public.

Academic performance
65% of Hanson students achieved 5 or more A*s to C's in 2010. In BTEC, Hanson was in the UK's top 20.

Notable former pupils

 Bad Boy Chiller Crew, bassline group
 Tom Cleverley (footballer currently at Watford F.C.)
 Lewis Emanuel, footballer
 Heather Smith, Rugby Player
 Steven Wells, journalist and former writer for Radio 4's 1990s On the Hour and BBC's The Day Today

Hanson Boys' Grammar School

 Sir Edward Victor Appleton FRS, Vice-Chancellor from 1949 to 1965 of the University of Edinburgh, received the 1947 Nobel Prize for Physics for investigations into the ionosphere, the Kennelly–Heaviside layer and the F region (Appleton layer) that reflect lower frequency radio waves, and became Jacksonian Professor of Natural Philosophy from 1936 to 1939 at the University of Cambridge
 David Bairstow, Yorkshire cricketer (wicket-keeper), father of England batsman (also a wicket-keeper) Jonny Bairstow
 Clarence Barton, Labour MP from 1945 to 1950 for Wembley South
 Vic Feather, Baron Feather, General Secretary of the Trades Union Congress (TUC) from 1969 to 1973, and President from 1973 to 1974 of the European Trade Union Confederation
 Peter Firth, film and TV actor, nominated for Best Supporting Actor in the 1978 50th Academy Awards, and known for the 1985 Letter to Brezhnev
 Sir William Hadwick, Chief General Manager from 1945 to 1951 of the National Provincial Bank
 Sir Trevor Holdsworth CVO, chairman from 1980 to 1988 of GKN, Chancellor from 1992 to 1997 of the University of Bradford
 Wilfrid Lawson, actor
 Tony McHale, co-created (with Mal Young) Holby City
 Andrew Mawson, Baron Mawson OBE, known for the Bromley by Bow Centre
 Rabbi Walter Rothschild, leader of the Berlin Reform and Liberal Jewish Communities, since 1998 and the Rabbi of the Bradford Synagogue and the Leeds Sinai Synagogue from 1984 until 1995.
 Leslie Sands, actor of the 1960s often playing dour policemen, who would consequently later appear in Juliet Bravo
 John Sewel, Baron Sewel CBE, leader of Aberdeen Council from 1977 to 1980, and President from 1982 to 1984 of the Convention of Scottish Local Authorities
 Edward Spurr, described as Bradford's Forgotten Inventor

Hanson Girls' Grammar School
 Christa Ackroyd, former presenter of Look North (at the comprehensive from 1972)
 Jeannie Crowther, actress
 Dame Margaret Eaton, Baroness Eaton OBE, politician
 Stephanie Turner, actress, notably for Insp Jean Darblay from 1980 to 1982 in Juliet Bravo

References

External links
 Hanson official website
 Newsnight in 2007
 WikiMapia
 EduBase

Academies in the City of Bradford
Schools in Bradford
Educational institutions established in 1897
1897 establishments in England
Secondary schools in the City of Bradford
Delta schools